The Temptations Sing Smokey is the second studio album by The Temptations for the Motown label, released on the Gordy Records subsidiary (G 912) in 1965. As its name implies, it is composed entirely of songs written and produced by Smokey Robinson, and several other members of the Miracles as well.

Several of the songs are covers of songs Robinson produced for the Miracles or Mary Wells, while the rest were originally recorded by The Temptations. Among these are three successful hit singles, starting with "The Way You Do the Things You Do", which featured Eddie Kendricks on lead vocals.  The next two songs feature lead vocals by new Temptation David Ruffin – "It's Growing" and the group's signature song, "My Girl".

Not included are two singles which predate these two singles, "I'll Be in Trouble" and "Girl (Why You Wanna Make Me Blue)" (whose b-side, "Baby, Baby I Need You", is here). These songs would be included on the next Temptations album, The Temptin' Temptations. A third hit single, "The Way You Do the Things You Do", is present here, although it was also issued on the previous Temptations album, Meet the Temptations.

Track listing

Side one
"The Way You Do the Things You Do" (Smokey Robinson, Bobby Rogers) (lead singer: Eddie Kendricks) 2:41
"Baby, Baby I Need You" (Robinson) (lead singers: Eddie Kendricks, Paul Williams, Temptations ensemble) 2:53
"My Girl" (Robinson, Ronald White) (lead singer: David Ruffin) 2:45
"What Love Has Joined Together" (Robinson, Rogers) (lead singer: Eddie Kendricks) 2:58
"You'll Lose a Precious Love" (Robinson) (lead singer: David Ruffin; Melvin Franklin on last line of bridge) 2:35
"It's Growing" (Robinson, Warren Pete Moore) (lead singer: David Ruffin) 3:00

Side two
"Who's Lovin' You" (Robinson) (lead singer: David Ruffin) 2:59
"What's So Good About Goodbye" (Robinson) (lead singer: Eddie Kendricks) 2:40
"You Beat Me to the Punch" (Robinson, White) (lead singer: Paul Williams) 2:45
"Way Over There" (Berry Gordy, Jr., Robinson) (lead singer: Eddie Kendricks) 3:03
"You've Really Got a Hold on Me" (Robinson) (lead singer: Eddie Kendricks; co-lead harmonies: David Ruffin, Paul Williams) 3:00
"(You Can) Depend on Me" (Gordy, Robinson) (lead singers: Eddie Kendricks, Otis Williams) 2:32

Unreleased recordings from the Sing Smokey sessions:
"What's Easy for Two Is So Hard for One" (Robinson) (lead singer: Paul Williams)
"Happy Landing" (Robinson, White) (lead singer: Eddie Kendricks)
Both these songs have subsequently been released.

Personnel
The Temptations 
 David Ruffin – vocals (all tracks except "Baby, Baby I Need You")
 Eddie Kendricks – vocals
 Paul Williams – vocals
 Melvin Franklin – vocals
 Otis Williams – vocals
 Elbridge "Al" Bryant – vocals ("Baby, Baby I Need You")
with:
 The Andantes – additional backing vocals ("It's Growing")
 The Funk Brothers – instrumentation
 Detroit Symphony Orchestra – strings
Technical
Smokey Robinson - producer, executive producer
Bob Folster - cover design

Chart and singles history

 Note – There was no Billboard R&B singles chart from November 1963 until January 1965. Most discographies include R&B information from Cash Box magazine to fill in the gap in the R&B chart, as is done here with the 1964 releases.

See also
List of number-one R&B albums of 1965 (U.S.)

References

The Temptations albums
1965 albums
Gordy Records albums
Albums produced by Smokey Robinson
Albums recorded at Hitsville U.S.A.
Albums arranged by Paul Riser